Server Assistant is the first program that is run after an install of Mac OS X Server. It can be run again to execute further configuration on a remote or local server. It is also capable of executing remote installation of software onto the server as well.

Server Assistant is a software wizard that guides the administrator through setting up functions of Mac OS X Server.

It is accessible from Finder > Applications > Server > Server Assistant

MacOS Server